Tony Walmsley is a Performance Coach, Founder of The Leaders Advisory with a wealth of knowledge from the world of top-level sport.

In 25 years in football, he won league titles, national championships and held head roles in the A-League, The Olympic Athletes Programme, and for Manchester United and Tranmere Rovers in Oceania and China, respectively.

Tony has transitioned from prominent sporting roles into business leadership positions in the technical supply chain and engineering sectors, as well as working in the customer engagement and technology fields.

These experiences in sport and business have given Tony the expertise to help individuals and teams perform with clarity, maturity and decisiveness in key moments.

Career
Tony Walmsley started his coaching career in 1989 when he served as player/coach for Riverside Olympic in Tasmania.
winning two League Cups, and the Night Series over two seasons, before joining George Town United, becoming Player of the Year in 1990. Walmsley joined Football Tasmania in the Role of Development Officer during which time he Coached the Tasmanian State Under 15 team to third position in the National Championships, leading to his appointment as the inaugural Head Coach of the NSW Intensive Training Centre and Olympic Athletes Program, steering the Women's team to a National Championship and assisting with the Australian National Team under Tom Sermanni.

As a coach educator with Football Australia Walmsley took up a position as regional Director of Coaching in Queensland. In subsequent years Walmsley served as Academy Director for the Manchester United Youth Development Programme in Oceania. He was then appointed the manager of Central Coast Mariners youth team for three seasons, where his team never finished outside the top two and won the A-League National Youth League in the 2011–12 season. In September 2012 he became the Head of Academy Recruitment for English League One side Sheffield United's youth team.

Walmsley was appointed as Technical Director of the Mariners on 19 February 2015  and caretaker head coach of the Mariners from 6 March 2015.

On 15 April 2015 Walmsley was announced as Mariners permanent Technical Director/Head Coach for the 2015–16 season.

Under Walmsley, the Mariners had their worst A-League performance to date in the 2015–16 season. The Mariners' 13 points, the fewest in club history, resulted in a last-place finish, and they set a league record by losing 20 games while winning only 3, a record low for the Mariners. Central Coast allowed 70 goals, the most in league history, and had a goal difference of −37, the worst by an A-League team. The Mariners' totals of goals conceded at home and away (32 and 38 respectively) were also A-League records, and they went the entire season without a clean sheet.

In the 2016 FFA Cup, the Mariners suffered a 2–1 loss to Green Gully SC at Green Gully Reserve, becoming just the second A-League team to be eliminated by a state league team in the FFA Cup. As a result of the last placed finish in the 2015–16 season, and the Mariners' elimination from the 2016 FFA Cup, Walmsley was sacked by the Mariners on 8 August 2016, with coaching duties in the leadup to the 2016–17 season taken up by assistant coach John Hutchinson in a caretaker role. Walmsley was eventually succeeded by Australia national under-20 soccer team manager Paul Okon.

Managerial statistics

References

External links

1966 births
Living people
English footballers
English football managers
Sheffield United F.C. non-playing staff
Central Coast Mariners FC non-playing staff
A-League Men managers
Player-coaches
Association footballers not categorized by position